Haft Cheshmeh-ye Lishtar (also Romanized as Haft Cheshmeh-ye Līshtar; also known as Haft Chashmeh, Haft Cheshmeh, and Haft Cheshmeh-ye ‘Olyā) is a village in Lishtar Rural District, in the Central District of Gachsaran County, Kohgiluyeh and Boyer-Ahmad Province, Iran. At the 2006 census, its population was 161, in 30 families.

References 

Populated places in Gachsaran County